Alastair Hudson (born 6 November 1968), FHEA, FRSA, is an English barrister and academic. He is, in 2017/18, employed at the University of Strathclyde, Glasgow and is also visiting professor of law at the University of Portsmouth. He has worked on the University of London International Programmes LLM programme since 2004. He was formerly professor of equity and finance law at the University of Exeter, having previously been professor of equity and finance law at the University of Southampton and, prior to that, professor of equity and law at Queen Mary, University of London. He was appointed a National Teaching Fellow in 2008, a Fellow of the Higher Education Academy, and a Fellow of the Royal Society of Arts. He was voted UK Law Teacher of the Year in 2008. He was awarded the Excellence in Teaching Award 2014 by the University of Southampton Students' Union for "Overall Outstanding Lecturer".

He has published educational online materials for Law students and for legal practitioners in the areas of equity, trusts law, company law, securities regulation, and finance law, including a range of podcasts, dramas and vidcasts.

Publications
His books include:
 Equity & Trusts; 9th edition, Routledge, 2016, 1,350pp
 Understanding Equity & Trusts; 6th edition, Routledge, 2016, 250pp
 "Principles of Equity and Trusts"; Routledge, 2016, 550pp
 Great Debates in Equity and Trusts; Palgrave, 2014, 257pp
 The Law of Finance; 2nd edition, Sweet & Maxwell "Classics Series", 2013, 1,452pp
 The Law and Regulation of Finance; 2nd edition, Sweet & Maxwell, 2013, 1,691pp
 Securities Law; 3rd edition, Sweet & Maxwell, 2013, 874pp
 The Law on Financial Derivatives; Sweet and Maxwell, 5th edition, 2012, 998pp
 Understanding Company Law; 1st edition, Routledge, 2011, 291pp
 The Law on Investment Entities; Sweet & Maxwell, 2000, 356pp
 Towards a just society: law, Labour and legal aid; ("Citizenship & Law Series"), Pinter, 1999, 270pp
 Swaps, Restitution, and Trusts; Sweet & Maxwell, 1999, 245pp
 The Law on Homelessness; Sweet & Maxwell, 1997, 449pp; and
 Principles of Equity and Trusts, Cavendish, 1999, 558pp

He has co-authored the following books:
 The Law of Trusts, with Geraint Thomas, 2nd edition, Oxford University Press, 2010, 1,681pp
 Charlesworth’s Company Law, with Stephen Girvin and Sandra Frisby, 18th edition, Sweet & Maxwell, 2010, 836pp (AH, 312pp)
 New Perspectives on Property Law, Obligations and Restitution; ed. Alastair Hudson; Cavendish, 2004, 378pp
 New Perspectives on Property Law, Human Rights, Height and the Home; ed. Alastair Hudson, Cavendish, 2004, 334pp
 Modern Financial Techniques, Derivatives and Law; ed. Alastair Hudson; Kluwer International, 2000, 246pp
 Credit Derivatives: Legal, Regulatory and Accounting Issues; ed. Alastair Hudson; Sweet & Maxwell, 1999, 198pp; and
 Palmer’s Company Law, (sole author of Part 5: Capital Issues and Part 5A: Open-ended investment companies), 25th edition, Sweet & Maxwell, ed. G. Morse
 Asset Protection Trusts and Finance Law in The International Trust, 3rd edition, Jordan's Publishing, 2011, ed D. Hayton

Politics
In the 1997 general election Hudson ran as a Labour Party candidate for the Conservative safe seat of Beaconsfield. Despite a 6.5% swing to Labour, he finished third with 10,063 votes, 659 behind Liberal Democrat candidate Peter Mapp and 14,646 behind sitting MP Dominic Grieve. Prior to the election he worked as an advisor to Paul Boateng, the Labour MP for Brent South.

References

External links
 Alastair Hudson's webpage

British legal scholars
Living people
1968 births
Fellows of the Higher Education Academy